James David Morton Foreman (24 April 1902–4 June 1992) was a New Zealand engineer, car salesman, businessman, plastics manufacturer and dollmaker. He was born in Pendleton, Lancashire, England on 24 April 1902.

References

1902 births
1992 deaths
20th-century New Zealand businesspeople
Dollmakers
20th-century New Zealand engineers